Started in April 2005, the Radia network is an international informal network of community radio stations that have a common interest in producing and sharing art works for the radio. In 2020, the network gathers 24 radio stations from 23 cities across 17 countries, speaking 10 different languages. It also organizes linked-up events and special broadcasts. Radia intends to be a space of reflection about today's radio and radio art. Its activities try to contribute to intercultural exchange and artworks' and artists' circulation.

The network's name freely refers to La Radia, a Futurist manifesto written by Filippo Tommaso Marinetti and Pino Masnata in 1933. The network's founders dropped the La to distance themselves from the Futurists' political views. As it stands alone, "radia" is simply "radio" or "radios" in some languages.

Shows 

The Radia Network's basis is a weekly 28 minutes show broadcast by all the stations. Each station produces the show in turns. Every round of shows is called a season.

Content 

As stated in their jingle, Radia is "bringing new and forgotten ways of making radio to [their] listeners. Each week [they] give artists the challenge to make radio that works all across Europe and beyond." The Radia show intends to cross boundaries and address people of different languages and cultures. It usually explores the different genres of radio art, separately or by mixing them: sound art, electroacoustic music, sound poetry, radio drama, soundscape.

Production 

Usually each member radio station commissions an artist from their local artistic community and gives him/her carte blanche for producing a show. In that sense, Radia uses radio as a gallery for sound art pieces.

Exchange and archive 

To share the shows the Radia Network formerly used Radioswap.net, a semi-public closed platform for program exchange between community radios. Now it utilizes the server space of one of its member stations. All Radia shows are archived at the Internet Archive.

Members 

Members of the Radia Network are radio stations, webradios and art-radio projects that broadcast the Radia weekly show and produce shows in turns.

Founding members 

On 3–7 February 2005, there was a first meeting of radio stations in Berlin under the banner of NERA (New European Radio Art). The decision was taken to start a broadcast season the following April, and an email discussion list was set up on which the name Radia was finally settled on.

Founding members are:

Resonance FM (London, UK)
Rádio Zero at the time designated RIIST (Lisbon, Portugal)
Kanal 103 (Skopje, Macedonia)
reboot.fm (Berlin, Germany)
 (Brussels, Belgium)
Radio Cult (Sofia, Bulgaria), inactive since December 2006
Tilos Radio (Budapest, Hungary), inactive since December 2007
 (Vienna, Austria)
 Radio Oxygen (Tirana, Albania), would actually never contribute.

New members 

 (Marseille, France), February 2006
Lemurie TAZ (Prague, Czech Republic), March 2006, inactive since November 2008
WGXC/Wave Farm at the time designated free103point9 (Acra, New York, USA), first non-European radio station, September 2006
 (Brussels, Belgium), January 2007
Soundart Radio (Dartington, UK), March 2007
 (Halle, Germany), May 2007
 (Frankfurt, Germany), April 2008
XL Air (Brussels, Belgium), June 2008, inactive since July 2018
CKUT (Montreal, Canada), July 2008
Radio One (Dunedin, New Zealand), August 2009
CFRC (Kingston, Canada), December 2009, inactive since December 2019
 (Graz, Austria), February 2010
 (Siena, Italy), March 2010
Radio WORM (Rotterdam, Netherlands), May 2010
Escuela Creativa de Radio TEA FM (Zaragoza, Aragon-Spain), January 2011
Radio Student (Ljubljana, Slovenia), February 2012
Curious Broadcast (Dublin, Ireland), April 2012, inactive since September 2013
Radio Valerie (Melbourne, Australia), July 2012, inactive since August 2012
 (Nantes, France), October 2012
Radio Nova (Oslo, Norway), February 2013, inactive since March 2018
Radio Campus Paris (Paris, France), March 2014
Eastside FM (Sydney, Australia), May 2015, inactive since December 2017
Kol HaCampus (Tel Aviv, Israel), May 2016, inactive since September 2017
DiffusionFM 91.9 (Sydney, Australia), January 2018
Usmaradio (San Marino), July 2018
 (Luxembourg), January 2019

Syndicating partners who play but do not produce Radia shows are Resonance Extra (Brighton, Bristol, Cambridge, London, Norwich, UK) and CFRU (Guelph, Canada).

Special events and broadcasts 

15–18 October 2004: Resonance "Radio Art Riot", a four-night event bringing together some of the foremost radio artists and thinkers from around the world in a studio-as-creative-lab situation which featured round table discussions, live radio art, performances at venues around London and streamed events from other countries. Themes included 'Plunderphonics/Sampling', 'Copyright/Copyleft' and 'Radio Text'. This was the first time that some of the radio stations that would later become Radia worked together - Resonance from the U.K., reboot.fm from Germany, Orange and Kunstradio from Austria, Tilos from Hungary and Radio Cult from Bulgaria.
10–14 April 2006: Meeting in Lisbon and co-producing of a radio art festival with Rádio Zero under the banner of RadiaLx2006.
15 September 2006: First Radia special, simultaneously broadcast live on 9 radio stations: Time labs is a collection of one-minute pieces from artists of the Radia Network. It was released for the final conference of the radio territories project.
April 2007: The Radia Network has received an honorary mention at the 2007 Prix Ars Electronica. According to the Ars Electronica website, "The Radia Network is a community of independent radio stations who have combined to facilitate an ongoing shared cultural initiative. The stations, based throughout Europe, share in weekly commissioned pieces that explore radio as an art form. Each station produces a piece in turn, which all of the partners then publish. The pieces do not seek to promote a common language, but to celebrate the diversity of the breadth of their contributors. It uses the possibilities opened up by the net to share the work and ideas not only of the stations but also of the artistic communities that themselves represent the audience of each contributor and then, through extension, of the whole."
19 July 2007: The Radia Network is presented at the Radio Grenouille's Grenouille Capitale festival in Paris, with a special piece by Radio Free Robots collective broadcast on Radio Campus Paris.
28 October 2007: The Radia Network was invited by the Radiophonic festival in Brussels. Radioactive Radiophony is a 4-hour live show made with in situ and streamed performances, simultaneously broadcast on 13 radio stations.
December 2007 – January 2008: Diverse retrospectives of the Network's recent activity. 3 journeys through Radia on ÖRF Kunstradio, a Radia retrospective on Resonance FM, Espectro Electro Magnético on Antena 2 (Rádio e Televisão de Portugal).
28 February – 8 March 2008: Radia shows are featured daily on the "AV festival radio station" in Newcastle. Besides this regular shows from Radia member stations are broadcast on Soundscape FM in Sunderland.
20 to 28 September 2008: the RadiaLx2008 festival hosts a meeting for Radia and promotes Radia shows and Radia artists performances in Lisbon, Portugal.
28 December 2008: a special 2008 review/mashup is broadcast at Kunstradio.
 Selected works from the more than, at the time, 200 productions of Radia shows could be listened during the 2009 edition of Festival Silêncio, promoted by Goethe-Institut Lisbon, Portugal.
 A special selection of Radia shows was broadcast during Radio Futura, a temporary station of the Future Places Festival in Porto, 14–17 October 2009.
 Radia gave support to the 3rd edition of the RadiaLx Festival in Lisboa in 2010. Several stations did live streamings to the Festival and other rebroacasted parts of it.
 In September 2010 Radia started uploading its archive into archive.org.
 From 12 to 16 October 2010 the full of season 23 of Radia programmes was re-broadcast during Future Places Festival in O'Porto, Portugal, incorporated in the Radio Futura temporary radio station (91.5 MHz FM Porto).
 From October to December 2010 ORF Kunstradio broadcast a series of five radio art programmes specially curated by Radia, that were recorded during the Radia Art Camp in July 2010 at the Gasometer in Oberhausen.
 From September to December 2012 the first complete retrospective of Radia shows was broadcast on Mobile Radio BSP as part of the 30th Biennial of São Paulo in Brazil.
 During the Radio Revolten festival in Halle, in Germany, - from 7 to 9 October 2016 - a general meeting of the Radia network took place, mixing performances from members and re-tuning the network for the future.
 A 21-part programme series called Radiaphiles showcasing member stations and associated artists of the Radia network was produced for and broadcast as part of documenta 14 in Kassel and Berlin from 17 June - 7 July 2017.

Notes

External links 

The Radia Network website Radia.fm
Old Radia Network website @ archive.org waybackmachine : from March 2005 to May 2006 radia.constantvzw.org
Radia Network website @ archive.org waybackmachine : from August 2006 onwards radia.fm

Radio networks